Dreamboats and Petticoats is a jukebox musical based on popular songs from the fifties and early sixties. The musical, featuring those songs of the rock 'n' roll era, is set around the years 1957 to 1963 and was written by Laurence Marks and Maurice Gran.

It was first performed at The Churchill Theatre in Bromley, England, in February 2009, followed by a UK tour. This run received rave critical reviews and widespread audience acclaim. It subsequently moved to the Savoy Theatre in London's West End from July to September in 2009 and then returned to London in a new location at the Playhouse Theatre, where it closed on 4 August 2012. Alongside the West End runs, the show toured the UK extensively, between 2009 and 2014. The current tour is a sequel, entitled Dreamboats and Miniskirts.

Synopsis
It's 1961, where Bobby, an awkward but talented teenager, is auditioning for a band at the local Youth Club. He almost gets the part, but is edged out by a last minute arrival to the auditions: the cool and confident Norman. The teenagers that hang out at Youth Club all know each other, even if they're not necessarily friends. These teens include Bobby and his best friend Ray, Ray's younger sister Laura who has a crush on Bobby, cool girl Sue whom Bobby has a crush on, and Donna, who is Sue's friend.

Bobby's father announces that the Youth Club association is holding the first National song writing competition. Bobby and Laura, who have similar tastes in music, agree to write a song together. At first they make some progress, with Bobby coming up with an idea and basic tune, which Laura takes on to expand into a full song. But Bobby then starts ignoring Laura when Sue, the girl he has a crush on, starts flirting with him. Laura warns Bobby that Sue is only pretending to be into him in order to make Norman jealous, but Bobby doesn't care.

The Youth Club are taken on a road trip to a local carnival, and their emotions run high. Ray and Donna get together and become a couple. Sue's plan to make Norman jealous works, and Norman takes her away to be alone. Bobby is crushed, and Laura tells him "I told you so". However, when the whole group gathers together at the end of night, Norman boasts to the others that he went "all the way" with Sue. Sue is enraged and humiliated, insisting that they only kissed. Bobby confronts Norman, insisting that he apologize to Sue. At first Norman refuses, so Bobby challenges Norman to an "official" fight in a ring, in which Bobby wins. Norman apologizes to Sue, and Sue is ecstatically grateful to Bobby and happily becomes his girl.

Laura tries to remind Bobby about their songwriting commitment but to no avail, since all his time is dedicated to Sue. Norman is also being ignored by Sue, even after apologizing and promising to become better. Norman then approaches Laura, both flirting with her with suggestions that what he really needs is a "good" girl, and that they should write a song together. Bobby is confused and upset when he hears about this from Ray, who also tells Bobby that Laura has had feelings for him for a long time. Bobby and Sue break up when Bobby accidentally causes Sue to fall out his bedroom window, but when he approaches Laura to reconcile, she claims that he only started to notice her because she's started dressing nicer and doing her hair.

Laura's 16th birthday party is held at the Youth Club. She and Sue decide to put the awkwardness between them to the past, and agree to be friends. Norman and Sue reconcile. Bobby and Laura confess their feelings in the locker room, admitting that they've each liked the other for a long time and didn't know what to do about it, and finally kiss.

News comes in from the songwriting competition. Bobby and Laura, who are a team again, have made it to the next round. Norman did not make the cut at all. It then jumps to the final National performance, where Bobby and Laura win with the results of the joint efforts, the pop song "Dreamboats and Petticoats".

Development
After spending several weeks at the number one spot in the UK Compilation Charts and with over two million copies sold of the first album, the unexpected success of Dreamboats and Petticoats CD series made producers of the series to consider a stage musical adaptation. Brian Berg, the managing director of Universal Music TV (UMTV) and director of Universal Music UK, reportedly saw a niche in the market for older audiences who preferred the music of their teenage years in comparison to the seemingly inaccessible youth-driven playlists on current radio stations. Berg saw the adaptation of a stage musical as a move that "would enhance the brand" and therefore got in touch with Bill Kenwright, producer Laurie Mansfield, director Bob Tomson, musical director Keith Strachan, choreographer Carole Todd and writers Laurence Marks and Maurice Gran to pen the book of the show. He had "the basic idea of youth clubs and nostalgia and a songwriting competition" as the basis of the show because he was a teenager in the sixties who attended a local youth club in Finsbury Park, north London. He added, "As kids growing up in the Sixties we all played in bands, I was a drummer in The Sound Barrier, the greatest unsigned band of the Sixties."

Productions

London (2009–2013)

Dreamboats and Petticoats was first performed in London at the Savoy Theatre on 22 July 2009. The run terminated on 31 October 2009 to make way for Legally Blonde.

After a three-month hiatus, the musical found a new location at the Playhouse Theatre on 6 January 2010. It closed on 4 August 2012. The 3rd and final London venue for the musical was the Wyndham's Theatre, where it had a limited run, 16 October 2012 to 19 January 2013.

First UK tour (2009)
Opening on 19 February 2009 at The Churchill Theatre in Bromley, Dreamboats and Petticoats had a successful run in theatres across the UK for five months. This tour finished on 18 July 2009 at the Sunderland Empire in Sunderland. Upon finishing, the production, due to heavy demand and unexpected success, moved to the West End for a three-month run. This production, therefore, had the same cast as the original London cast.

Second UK tour (2010)
Again starting at the Churchill Theatre in Bromley, Dreamboats and Petticoats enjoyed another tour of the UK. This time with an alternative cast to the first time. The tour started on 19 January 2010 and played its last performance on 4 December 2010 in Grimsby.

The cast were:

Third UK tour (2011) 
A third tour started in June 2011, opening at the Theatre Royal, Windsor.

The cast were:

2017 UK Tour
Again starting at the Theatre Royal, Windsor, Dreamboats and Petticoats enjoyed another tour of the UK. The tour started in January 2017 and played its last performance in Brighton in October.

The cast were:

Future productions
Brian Berg, the executive producer for Universal records stated that there are plans for productions in the US and Australia and the possibility of a feature film in 2012. To date, there are no international productions or film productions.

Spin-offs and sequels
Bill Kenwright, the original producer, has also produced Save The Last Dance For Me and Dreamboats And Miniskirts. Save the Last Dance for Me is a spin-off production which employed a lot of the same creative team and cast, but did not continue the story from Dreamboats and Petticoats. It primarily utilised the songs of Doc Pomus and Mort Shuman. Dreamboats and Miniskirts is a sequel that continues the story of Bobby and Laura. Set in 1963 it tells how the band deals with the start of the British Invasion.

A third instalment of the Dreamboats and Petticoats franchise has recently been announced, with Dreamboats and Petticoats - The Christmas Party which will open at the Broadway Theatre, Peterborough at the end of 2015.

Music

Musical numbers

Act I
 Overture - Band (The Conquests)
 Let's Dance - Bobby
 The Wanderer - Norman
 Jezebel - Donna
 To Know Him Is to Love Him - Laura
 Good Timin' - Norman
 You Won't Catch Me Crying - Bobby
 Dream Baby Dream - Laura	
 You Won't Catch Me Crying (reprise) - Laura
 Wonderful Land - Band (The Conquests)
 Shakin' All Over - Sue & Norman
 In Dreams - Bobby
 In Dreams (reprise) - Bobby
 Bobby's Girl - Ray & Donna
 Palisades Park - The Company
 Little Town Flirt - Phil & Ray
 Sweet Nothin's - Sue & Donna
 Runaway / Who's Sorry Now? - Bobby & Laura
 Poetry in Motion - Ray
 It's Only Make Believe Laura	
 Do You Wanna Dance? The Company

Act II
 Entr'acte - Band (The Conquests)
 Dream Lover - Older Bobby & Bobby
 Great Pretender - Norman
 Only the Lonely - Bobby
 Donna - Ray
 Teenager in Love - Laura
 Runaround Sue - Bobby, Ray & Band (The Conquests)
 Shop Around - Phil
 Dreamboats and Petticoats (short) - Bobby
 Only Sixteen - Bobby
 Da Do Ron Ron - Donna, Sue, & The Company
 Happy Birthday Sweet Sixteen - The Company
 Wonderful World - Laura & Bobby
 Quarter to Three - Ray
 You Don't Know -  Sue 
 Let It Be Me - Bobby & Laura
 Where the Angels Go - The Carnegie Sisters
 Dreamboats and Petticoats - Bobby & Laura
 Let's Twist Again - Norman
 C'mon Everybody - Ray
 At the Hop - The Company

Recordings
A live cast recording of the original London cast was released on 1 December 2009. It was recorded live, in front of audiences, at the Savoy Theatre.

Awards and nominations

Original London production

References

External links
Official website for the stage adaptation

2009 musicals
Jukebox musicals
West End musicals
Fiction set in 1961
British musicals